Aurora Vergara Figueroa (born May 14, 1987) is a Colombian sociologist and academic who has been a tenured professor in the Department of Social Studies at the Icesi University and director of the Center for Afrodiasporic Studies.

In July 2022, she was appointed to be part of the transition team of the Gustavo Petro government along with Mauricio Lizcano, Carolina Corcho and Daniel Rojas. In August that year, the newly appointed Minister of Education, Alejandro Gaviria, appointed her as Deputy Minister of National Education.

On February 27, 2023, she was appointed Minister of Education by President Gustavo Petro, replacing the outgoing Alejandro Gaviria.

Early life
Aurora Vergara Figueroa was born in Cali, Cauca Valley but grew up in Itsmina, Chocó since she was four years old. She arrived there with her brother and her mother after the disappearance of her father when he was a telephone employee in Emcali.

Due to the lack of opportunities to study in Istmina, Vergara Figueroa considered enrolling in a convent as this could be an opportunity to continue her studies; however, her mother did not give her the required permission. In 2003, she won the Convenio prize Andrés Bello in history, which allowed her to move to Cali and enter the Universidad del Valle to study sociology, despite the economic difficulties and having to work in various trades such as domestic service to pay for her expenses, she was able to complete her studies. One of her professors encouraged her and helped her to apply for a scholarship at the University of Massachusetts Amherst, United States where she obtained a master's degree and a doctorate in sociology. Later she did a postdoctoral fellowship at Harvard University

In 2014, Vergara Figueroa won the Martin Diskin Dissertation award from LASA (Latin American Studies Association) for the best PhD dissertation creatively incorporating a combination of activism and scholarship. In 2016, she was nominated as one of the 20 best leaders in Colombia by the Fundación Liderazgo y Democracia.

References

External links 

|-

|-

1987 births
Living people
Cabinet of Gustavo Petro
Government ministers of Colombia
Women government ministers of Colombia
21st-century Colombian politicians
21st-century Colombian women politicians